Kunzea juniperoides is a flowering plant in the myrtle family, Myrtaceae and is endemic to a small area of New South Wales. It is a small shrub with narrow leaves and small groups of white flowers near the end of the longer branches. It is distinguished from similar kunzeas by the large number of scale-like perules and bracts surrounding the groups of flowers.

Description
The flowers are arranged in groups of mostly three to eight near the ends of the branches.

Taxonomy and naming
Kunzea juniperoides was first formally described in 2016 by Hellmut R. Toelken and the description was published in Journal of the Adelaide Botanic Garden. The specific epithet (juniperoides) refers to the similarity of the leaves of this species to those of miniature forms of Juniperus communis. (The suffix -oides means "likeness" in Latin.)

There are two subspecies:

Distribution and habitat
This kunzea grows in heath and woodland on the South Coast and nearby tablelands of New South Wales.

References

juniperoides
Flora of New South Wales
Myrtales of Australia
Plants described in 2016
Endemic flora of Australia
Taxa named by Hellmut R. Toelken